Skaggs Hollow is a valley in McDonald County in the U.S. state of Missouri.

Skaggs Hollow has the name of the local Skaggs family.

References

Valleys of McDonald County, Missouri
Valleys of Missouri